Steven Craig Knutson is a former American football guard who played three seasons in the National Football League, first with the Green Bay Packers and later with the San Francisco 49ers.

Biography
Knutson was born Steven Craig Knutson on October 5, 1951 in Bagley, Minnesota.

Career
Knutson was drafted in the sixteenth round of the 1975 NFL Draft by the Atlanta Falcons and would later play two seasons with the Green Bay Packers. During his final season, he would play with the San Francisco 49ers.

He played at the collegiate level at the University of Southern California.

See also
 List of Green Bay Packers players
 List of San Francisco 49ers players

References

1951 births
People from Clearwater County, Minnesota
Green Bay Packers players
San Francisco 49ers players
USC Trojans football players
Living people
American football offensive guards